Zakopower is a Polish Goral folk music group. It is named after Zakopane, the hometown of its lead singer.

Awards 
 2008 - Fryderyk award for Folk Album of the Year 
 2008 - National Festival of Polish Song in Opole, Grand Prix

Discography

Studio albums

Video albums

Notes

External links
Official site

Gorals
Polish folk groups
Polish pop music groups
Polish Gorals